Babi or BABI may refer to:

 Babi Yar (book), a 1966 book by Anatoly Kuznetsov
 Babi (mythology), a baboon god in Egyptian mythology
 Babi (Pashtun tribe) or Babai, a Pashtun tribe of Pakistan and Afghanistan
 Babi Yar (poem), poems about Babi Yar
 Babi (title), various Indian titles
 Babi dynasty, a Muslim dynasty in British India
 Babi Island (disambiguation), several islands of this name in south east Asia
 Babı, a village and municipality in Azerbaijan
 Bábí, a follower of Bábism
 FK Babi, a football club in the Republic of Macedonia
 BABI, a 2020 movie by Malaysian director Namewee

People
 Matheus Babi (born 1997), Brazilian footballer
 Parveen Babi (1954–2005), Indian actress
 Babi Badalov (born 1959), Azerbaijani visual artist and poet
 Babi Dewet (born 1986), Brazilian novelist
 Babi Rossi (born 1990), Brazilian model and TV presenter
 Babi Slymm, ring name of Tony Drake (born 1978), American professional wrestler
 Babi Xavier (born 1974), Brazilian actress, model and TV hostess

See also
 Babi Island (disambiguation)
 Babis (disambiguation)
 Babai (disambiguation)